Jean Schneider is an American historian.  She is a Pulitzer Prize for History winner. She was the research associate of Leonard D. White. She was a graduate (Class of 1921) of Vassar College.

References

Year of birth missing
Year of death missing
Pulitzer Prize for History winners
American historians
Vassar College alumni
American women historians